Rockwood is a village in Randolph County, Illinois, United States. The population was 42 at the 2010 census. It is the headquarters of the Middle Mississippi River National Wildlife Refuge.

Geography
Rockwood is located at  (37.839069, -89.696740).

Demographics

As of the census of 2000, there were 41 people, 11 households, and 7 families residing in the village. The racial makeup of the village was 100.00% White.

There were 11 households, out of which 27.3% had children under the age of 18 living with them, 54.5% were married couples living together, 18.2% had a female householder with no husband present, and 27.3% were non-families. 27.3% of all households were made up of individuals, and 9.1% had someone living alone who was 65 years of age or older. The average household size was 3.73 and the average family size was 4.50.

In the village, the population was spread out, with 36.6% under the age of 18, 4.9% from 18 to 24, 31.7% from 25 to 44, 19.5% from 45 to 64, and 7.3% who were 65 years of age or older. The median age was 32 years. For every 100 females, there were 95.2 males. For every 100 females age 18 and over, there were 116.7 males.

The median income for a household in the village was $61,250, and the median income for a family was $38,750. Males had a median income of $21,563 versus $23,750 for females. The per capita income for the village was $9,387. None of the population and none of the families were below the poverty line.

References

External links
Randolph County Herald Tribune, local newspaper

Villages in Randolph County, Illinois
Villages in Illinois
Illinois populated places on the Mississippi River